"No One Dies from Love" is a song by Swedish singer-songwriter Tove Lo, released on 3 May 2022 as the second single from her fifth studio album Dirt Femme. It is the first release by Lo's record label Pretty Swede Records, an imprint of Mtheory. Lo co-wrote this song with Ludvig Söderberg, who is also known as A Strut. The song was produced by Söderberg. The music video was released on the same day and directed by Brazilian filmmaking team Alaska Filmes.

Track listing
No One Dies from Love – Single
"No One Dies from Love" – 3:06

No One Dies from Love (220 Kid remix) – Single
"No One Dies from Love" (220 Kid remix) – 3:06
No One Dies from Love (The Remixes) – EP

 "No One Dies from Love" (Jacques Greene remix) – 5:22
 "No One Dies from Love" (DJ_Dave Edit) – 3:52
 "No One Dies from Love" (220 Kid remix) – 3:06

Charts

Release history

References

Tove Lo songs
2022 songs
2022 singles
Songs written by Tove Lo
Songs written by Ludvig Söderberg